Land-based game fishing is a form of big-game sport fishing in which anglers attempt to catch oceanic game fish from shore rather than from ocean-going boats. The locations for such activities are generally rock platforms, though wharfs, jetties and beaches are also common. Some species such as sharks can be targeted in shallow littoral water, however most other species prefer deeper pelagic water, and this limits the areas where these types can be fished from the shore. Tackle used is usually comparable to that used on boats, but some differences are necessary, such as changes in rod length. Different tackle is used according to location and species targeted.

The billfish (swordfish, marlin and sailfish) and the larger tuna (bluefin, yellowfin) are the main target species; smaller game fish are also sought, such as Spanish mackerel, dolphinfish, wahoo, and smaller tuna species such as albacore, skipjack or longtail, etc.

Shark fishing 
Land–based shark fishing, or LBSF, has had some popularity worldwide since the early 1900s. Sizeable numbers of participants exist in Australia, South Africa and the Gulf and East Coast states of the United States, especially popular in Texas, Florida and North Carolina. As of 2017 multiple great white sharks have also been caught and tagged and historically the great white was a fairly common catch for land based anglers in South Africa. Many land–based shark fishermen use catch and release techniques and participate in tagging programs to advance limited scientific knowledge of migrations and growth rates among other data.

Since the early 2000s land-based shark fishing has also courted and attracted controversy, especially among coastal townships in the southern U.S. This is chiefly due to the mistaken belief that anglers attract sharks closer to shore or use chum to catch sharks. This belief is inaccurate though as the mechanics of wave and water currents do not lend themselves to effective use of chumming and baits used are not significantly larger or different from what is already present in the water naturally. Effective chumming involves spreading a long trail of significant amounts of fish blood and oils through a current to create a scent line. These trails often need to be miles long to become effective as they still require a shark to initially swim through the chum on its normal travel. This technique loses effectiveness around beach areas as wave action causes currents to travel back onto a small area of the beach, washing up the scent rather than creating a trail that can be followed.

Locations
The best land-based game fishing is at present restricted to very few areas around the world. The best-known spots are in South Africa, New Zealand, Australia and the Andaman Islands, of which Barren and Narcondam Island have allowed catching marlin from the rocks.

Along the east coast of Australia, land-based game fishing can be divided into two fairly distinct geographic regions. On the north coast of New South Wales, from approximately Sydney northwards, light tackle is generally used, with smaller target species such as longtail tuna, Spanish mackerel and cobia. Particularly noted are the rock platforms of Jervis Bay, where black marlin of up to  have been caught using bait floated out on balloons. South of Sydney, heavier tackle is used as the target species are generally much larger (due to Bergmann's rule), with the main targets being black marlin, yellowfin tuna, yellowtail kingfish and sharks.

See also
Surf fishing

External links 
 International Game Fishing Association
 Land Based Marlin Fishing
 Land based shark fishing
NOAA Fisheries Shark Website
National Marine Fisheries Services / Apex Predator Tagging Program

Recreational fishing